Norine A. MacDonald QC is the President and Founder of RAIN Research Group an international research firm providing the latest on AI and Defense. 

She was formerly President and Founder of The International Council on Security and Development (ICOS), an international security and development think tank founded in 2002 with offices in Kabul, London, Rio de Janeiro, Brussels and Paris, and field offices in the Afghan cities of Lashkar Gah and Kandahar City.

Ms MacDonald is Former Visiting Distinguished Fellow at National Defense University. In 2020 MacDonald authored, 'Killing Me Softly: Competition in Artificial Intelligence and Unmanned Aerial Vehicles' with George Howell.

She graduated from Massachusetts Institute of Technology Sloan School of Management in Artificial Intelligence: Implications for Business Strategy in September 2020. 

In 2018 MacDonald was awarded the U.S. Department of the Army Decoration for Distinguished Civilian Service and also in 2018, she received the Distinguished Public Service Medal for exceptional service to the United States Army.

ICOS provides innovative analysis and recommendations on the connections between foreign policy, security, development and counter-narcotics policies. It convenes politicians, high-profile academics, independent experts and NGOs in order to accomplish its mission. It aims to work as the dialogue partner with senior policy-makers at the national and international levels in order to foster high-level exchanges and new ideas on bridging security, development and counter-narcotics policies.

MacDonald has appeared on CNN to discuss the destabilizing effect of poppy crop eradication on farmers in Afghanistan. In July 2008 she made a further appearance on CNN to talk about ICOS's report Iraq: 'Angry Hearts and Angry Minds'. She also co-edited two books: Global Philanthropy and Philanthropy in Europe: A Rich Past, A Promising Future.

Since 2005 MacDonald has led an extensive programme in Afghanistan focusing on global security development. Through field research, ICOS investigates the relationship between counter-narcotics, military, and development policies and their consequences on Afghanistan's reconstruction efforts. The Council's reports and video footage provide insight into the deteriorating development and security situations on the ground, especially in southern Afghanistan, and make policy recommendations to a broad audience of senior policy-makers and experts in NATO countries.

As President of The Gabriel Foundation, MacDonald is a member of the Network of European Foundations for Innovative Cooperation (NEF). This is a platform which brings together twelve of the leading philanthropic organisations in Europe. Within NEF, MacDonald is the Managing Director of The Mercator Fund, which launches and supports initiatives on Europe's role in global social issues.  One such project is The Global Media Centre.

MacDonald is also a member of the International Advisory Council of the International Crisis Group (ICG). In February 2007, she was awarded the First Class Medal of Merit of the Italian Red Cross for outstanding contributions to international humanitarian cooperation. In October 2008 MacDonald was invited to become a fellow of the Royal Society of Arts.

MacDonald has international experience in law, academic research, policy, advocacy and philanthropy. She has testified before the Standing Committee on Foreign Affairs and International Development and Standing Committee on National Defence in Canada, and the House of Commons' Defence Committee in the United Kingdom. In October 2009, she testified before the US Senate Caucus on International Narcotics Control during a hearing on 'U.S. Counternarcotics Strategy in Afghanistan'.

MacDonald's work has been featured in a long list of publications including the Sunday Times, The Globe and Mail, The New York Times, The Washington Post and the Daily Telegraph, while she has also appeared on CNN, BBC, CBC, CTV and Al Jazeera International. She reports in her biography that she is a member of the Frontline Club.

Before founding ICOS, MacDonald was a partner in the law firm Bull, Housser and Tupper, specialising in commercial litigation, charities and tax law. Moreover, MacDonald held several prominent offices as a Bencher of the Law Society of British Columbia.

MacDonald holds a BA and an LLB from the University of British Columbia, and completed the Advance Management Program at INSEAD in France in 2005. She was appointed Queen's Counsel in 1997.

References

Year of birth missing (living people)
Living people
Lawyers in British Columbia
University of British Columbia alumni
Peter A. Allard School of Law alumni
Canadian women lawyers